Samone may refer to:

Samone, Piedmont in the province of Torino, Italy
Samone, Trentino in the province of Trento, Italy
Samone, a subdivision of the village of Guiglia in the province of Modena, Italy